The 1979 Artistic Gymnastics World Cup was held in Tokyo, Japan in 1979.

Medal winners

References

1979
Artistic Gymnastics World Cup
International gymnastics competitions hosted by Japan
1979 in Japanese sport